Comic Con Liverpool is a fan convention held twice a year in the city of Liverpool, United Kingdom attracting 43,000+ attendees across two large venues situated along the Liverpool waterfront, that celebrates films, cult television, video gaming, anime, cosplay and comic books which is organised by UK Events company Monopoly Events.

History and organisation
Comic Con Liverpool began its annual run of events in 2018 after the Movie Comic Media (MCM) Expo Group ceased their own annual comic convention event in Liverpool after hosting it since 2015. Monopoly Events CEO Andy Kleek was approached by Exhibition Centre Liverpool who wanted to continue hosting an annual event for the people of the city and its surrounding areas.

Monopoly Events is a Manchester-based event organization company that specializes in events held in the North West of England and Scotland. Along with the Liverpool event, they are also responsible for organizing Comic Con Scotland, For the Love of Wrestling, For the Love of Sci-Fi, For the Love of Horror, For the Love of Wrestling, and Comic Con Manchester with new events, For the Love of MMA, Comic Con Wales, Comic Con Northern Ireland and Comic Con Scotland North East joining the fold in 2022. Originally a three-day event, Monopoly Events reduced it to run over two consecutive days. The convention includes celebrity guest appearances from various film, television, video gaming, anime and comic book series including The Vampire Diaries, The Walking Dead, Cobra Kai, My Hero Academia, Overwatch, Doctor Who, Star Trek, Star Wars, Harry Potter, Red Dwarf, Stranger Things, The Lord of the Rings, Glee, and many others.

The convention is run between 3 exhibition halls and an atrium which are opened out to become one large space, and as of the 2020 event, another mezzanine area, and 3 large auditoriums. In 2021 the event expanded again to include the adjoining ACC Liverpool. The main exhibition hall features a large dealers zone selling movie, comic, and science fiction related memorabilia, artwork, and collectibles as well as various film props and sets (something for which the Monopoly Events is famous for, making their event experiences very different from others like them within the UK), vehicles from different franchises, a four-screen LED which projects guest talk panels live from the auditoriums, celebrity guest professional photoshoots and autograph sessions, cosplay events, and other displays.

In 2018 at the very first Comic Con Liverpool hosted by Monopoly Events in March 2018, actor Verne Troyer made his last comic con appearance before his death just over a month later.

Future plans for Comic Con Liverpool include expansion out across all three venues within the M&S Bank Arena, incorporating a festival-style atmosphere, and increasing capacity dramatically.

Venue
Comic Con Liverpool is held exclusively at Exhibition Centre Liverpool within the King's Docks, part of Liverpool's famous port area. As of November 2021, the event expanded into the adjoined ACC Liverpool due to the sheer growth of the event as a whole. Situated in the newly extended area were more guests, props and sets, and a children's activities area which included fairground attractions. At the same time organizers, Monopoly Events announced that they would begin hosting two events a year instead of one as per the previous years, one in May and another in November of each year due to overwhelming popularity.

Show features

Celebrity guests
As with many other fan convention events, celebrity guests from past and present popular media are regularly invited to Comic Con Liverpool and are an extremely popular part of the event, posing for professional photographs with fans and providing autographs as well as giving fans the chance to meet them and chat in person. Monopoly Events is well known for bringing first-time guests to the UK, as well as guests that are from older cult film and television shows of past decades such as the 1980s and 1990s. Sometimes the celebrities involved will use their appearances to raise awareness and funds for a charity or cause important to them, while others use the opportunity to promote upcoming projects such as new films or television shows.

Celebrity panels
Most, if not all, of the celebrity guests at Comic Con Liverpool appear on stage at some point throughout the course of the event, answering both host and fan questions alike. In previous years the stage was set up in the main exhibition hall where the other event features also took place, however, at the 2020 event, to cope with increased demand for seats, the panels were moved into three auditoriums with tiered seating for more comfort and to provide a more intimate experience for fans. The panels were streamed live from the auditoriums into the main exhibition halls onto four large LED screens hung above the center of the hall for other attendees to see.

Photographs
Comic Con Liverpool includes a double professional photoshoot area where fans can have their photo taken with their favourite guest or guests before collecting them at the exit of the area.

Autographs
The event also includes an autograph area where celebrity guests from film and TV sign items for the public and spend a few minutes chatting with their fans.

Cosplay
A large part of the event is devoted to the cosplay hobby where members of the public are allowed, and encouraged, to take part in dressing up as characters from popular genres such as film and television. Cosplaying has become one of the most popular parts of many fan conventions around the world and can be used as a platform to showcase the costumer's latest handywork, to show devotion to their favourite characters or engage in role-play with other cosplayers in the same series, as well as to meet new people with mutual interests as themselves. The Comic Con Liverpool event, like all of the Monopoly Events shows, hosts a cosplay competition every year with both adult and child participation encouraged and prizes given for the best costumes.

Prop and set exhibits
Monopoly Events is famous for providing a vast array of props and set builds for its visitors to enjoy, with Comic Con Liverpool being no exception, visitors can find exhibits such as a full-sized X-wing fighter from Star Wars, the Tardis from Doctor Who, the DeLorean Time Machine from Back to the Future, a full-sized Peterbilt Truck from Transformers, a talking Falkor head from The NeverEnding Story film which guests could sit atop of and have a photograph taken as well as the Swamp of Sadness from the same film and Del Boy's flat from the cult British television show Only Fools and Horses and much more. 

New props and sets which have been introduced since the November 2021 event include the Mystic Grill from The Vampire Diaries, the Cobra Kai dojo from Cobra Kai as well as the Myagi-Do dojo, the Fiat Cinquecento from The Inbetweeners and more, many of these being used with celebrities in photoshoots.

Retro gaming area and other attractions
Comic Con Liverpool has a large area dedicated to retro gaming consoles for visitors to play, in 2020 the event moved this feature into a larger area upstairs and included tournaments and big-screen battles and races between gamers. In May 2022 new areas were created, offering the public opportunities to play tabletop board games, Dungeons and Dragons, Warhammer and more.

Trader zone
Within the main ECL exhibition hall, there is a vast trader zone that contains 100s of dealers selling film and television, comic and science fiction-related memorabilia, comics, games, artwork, toys, and collectibles.

Artists alley
The event has a large Artists Alley section which is situated inside the ACC Liverpool, where the public can meet published comic book artists and authors, and buy pieces of their work.

Location, dates and notable guests

See also
 List of comic book conventions
 Comic book convention
 List of multigenre conventions

References

External links
 
 Monopoly Events Official Website
 Starburst Magazine Review of Comic Con Liverpool 2020
 Review of Comic Con Liverpool 2020
 ‘Inbetweeners’ stars set to reunite at this year’s Comic Con

Multigenre conventions
Science fiction conventions in the United Kingdom
Recurring events established in 2018
Comics conventions
Fan conventions
British fan conventions
Events in Liverpool